Wanyá Jermaine Morris (born July 29, 1973)  is an American singer, best known as a member of the R&B group Boyz II Men.

Television and film appearances 
Morris was announced as one of the celebrities who would compete on season 22 of Dancing with the Stars on March 8, 2016. He was partnered with professional dancer Lindsay Arnold. Morris and Arnold made it to the semifinals of the show, but were then eliminated and finished the competition in fourth place overall, despite having the highest accumulative average at the time of their elimination.

Additional television and film appearances include: the music documentary film Happy on the Ground (2013), The Odd Couple (2016), Whose Line is it Anyway? (2017), Hollywood Darlings (2017), To Tell the Truth (2017), Long Shot (2019) and Celebrity Wheel of Fortune (2021).

Morris appeared in the Christmas special, A Very Boy Band Holiday, in December 2021. He also performed during I Can See Your Voice in March 2022.

Personal life 
 Morris married Traci Nash in 2002. They have six children together, including four sons who are in a tribute boy band called WanMor and two daughters. Morris married Amber Reyes in 2019, without being legally divorced from wife & mother of his 6 children, Traci Nash Morris Floyd Mayweather Jr. and Boyz II Men member Shawn Stockman attending the wedding.

Discography

Singles  
 "Brokenhearted" with Brandy from Brandy (1994)
 "I'll Be There" with Mariah Carey from Fantasy: Mariah Carey at Madison Square Garden (1995)
 "Let It Out" with Lisa "Left Eye" Lopes from Eye Legacy (2009)

Unofficial solo projects 
 Millennium Renaissance (compilation) (2000)
 Unreleased (mixtape) (2007)

Other appearances 
 "Come for More" (song from Uninvited Guest film as Mo) (2000/2001)
 "Happy in Hell" (song with Colt Ford from Declaration of Independence album) (2012)
 “BLOW MY LOAD” (song with Tyler the Creator   Dâm-Funk and Syd from CHERRY BOMB album) (2015)
 The After Party (band with NSYNC’s Joey Fatone and AJ McLean & Nick Carter of Backstreet Boys) (2021)

References

External links 
 Boyz II Men Official website
 Wanya Morris' record label website
 
 [ Wanya Morris] at Allmusic

1973 births
21st-century African-American male singers
American contemporary R&B singers
American soul musicians
American tenors
Boyz II Men members
Living people
Musicians from Philadelphia
Singers from Pennsylvania
Grammy Award winners